Filippo Zaniberti (1585–1636) was an Italian painter of the late Mannerist period.

Biography
He was born in Brescia and active in Venice, where he became a pupil of Santo Peranda. Zaniberti's style recalls the richness of Paolo Veronese. He painted a Mannah in the desert for the main altarpiece of the church of Santa Maria Nuova of Venice.

He worked alongside the fellow Peranda disciple, Matteo Ponzone, in the decoration of the Ducal palace of Mirandola. He painted a Marriage of St Catherine for the church of San Carlo of Brescia, a St Peter in Chains for the church of San Faustino Maggiore, The Grace found in the National Gallery of London, Rinaldo and Armida for the Art Gallery of Monaco, and an altarpiece for the Duomo of Sebenico (now Šibenik, Croatia).

References

1585 births
1636 deaths
16th-century Italian painters
Italian male painters
17th-century Italian painters
Painters from Venice
Painters from Brescia
Mannerist painters